Lin Yu-hsien (born 27 September 1991) is a Taiwanese badminton player.

Career 
He plays in the men's singles. He participated in the 2016 Vietnam Open Grand Prix, in the 2016 Chinese Taipei Masters and in the 2015 Chinese Taipei Masters Grand Prix.

Achievements

BWF World Tour (1 title, 1 runner-up) 
The BWF World Tour, which was announced on 19 March 2017 and implemented in 2018, is a series of elite badminton tournaments sanctioned by the Badminton World Federation (BWF). The BWF World Tour is divided into levels of World Tour Finals, Super 1000, Super 750, Super 500, Super 300 (part of the HSBC World Tour), and the BWF Tour Super 100.

Men's singles

BWF Grand Prix (1 runner-up) 
The BWF Grand Prix had two levels, the Grand Prix and Grand Prix Gold. It was a series of badminton tournaments sanctioned by the Badminton World Federation (BWF) and played between 2007 and 2017.

Men's singles

  BWF Grand Prix Gold tournament
  BWF Grand Prix tournament

BWF International Challenge/Series (2 titles, 1 runner-up) 
Men's singles

  BWF International Challenge tournament
  BWF International Series tournament
  BWF Future Series tournament

References

External links 
 

Living people
1991 births
People from Yunlin County
Taiwanese male badminton players